Sajid Rehman is a Pakistani cricketer. He made his first-class debut for Islamabad in the 2017–18 Quaid-e-Azam Trophy on 29 October 2017. He made his List A debut for Islamabad in the 2017–18 Regional One Day Cup on 2 February 2018.

References

External links
 

Year of birth missing (living people)
Living people
Pakistani cricketers
Place of birth missing (living people)
Islamabad cricketers